Stacey Francis-Bayman, previously known as Stacey Francis (born 1 January 1988) is a former England netball international. She was a member of the England teams that won bronze medals at the 2010 Commonwealth Games and at the 2011 and 2015 Netball World Cups. At club level she has played for both Team Bath and Yorkshire Jets in the Netball Superleague, for Canterbury Tactix in the ANZ Championship and for West Coast Fever in Suncorp Super Netball. Between 2005–06 and 2013 she was a prominent member of the Team Bath squad as they won five Superleague titles. She played in the 2010 and 2013 grand finals and in both 2011 and 2013 she was named the Netball Superleague Player of the Season. In 2017 she was inducted into the University of Bath/Team Bath Hall of Fame for Sport.

Early life, family and education
Stacey is the daughter of Kevin Francis, a former professional footballer, and his wife, Sharon. She has a sister, Keisha. In her youth she played both association football and basketball before concentrating on netball. When Stacey was 17 her family emigrated to Canada. Stacey opted to remain in England to complete her education and pursue her netball career.

Stacey is originally from Bromsgrove and attended North Bromsgrove High School. From aged 14 she began playing for the Bromsgrove-based Ryland Netball Club. Between 2006 and 2009 she attended the University of Bath were she gained a BSc in Sports Performance. Between 2009 and 2013 she attended Cardiff Metropolitan University where she completed an MA in English.

Playing career

Netball Superleague
Team Bath
Francis began her senior career in 2005 with Team Bath, making two appearances during their final Super Cup campaign. In 2005–06, aged just 17, she was the youngest member of Team Bath's inaugural   
Netball Superleague squad. Between 2005–06 and 2013 she was a prominent member of the Team Bath squad as they won five Superleague titles. She was player of the match in the 2010 Netball Superleague Grand Final and made a second grand final appearance in 2013. In both 2011 and 2013 she was named the Netball Superleague Player of the Season. In 2017 she was inducted into the University of Bath/Team Bath Hall of Fame for Sport. In both 2018 and 2019 Francis returned to play for Team Bath as a guest in the British Fast5 Netball All-Stars Championship.

Yorkshire Jets
In 2015, after ten seasons playing for Team Bath, Francis joined   Yorkshire Jets. She subsequently captained Jets during the 2016 Netball Superleague season.

Surrey Storm
In 2017 Francis played for Surrey Storm as a guest in the British Fast5 Netball All-Stars Championship.

Australia and New Zealand
Canterbury Tactix
In 2011 Francis joined Canterbury Tactix. Her team mates at Tactix included fellow England international, Joanne Harten. However Francis missed half the 2012 ANZ Championship season through injury.

West Coast Fever
After playing for England in the 2016 Netball Quad Series, Francis was approached by West Coast Fever of the Suncorp Super Netball. Francis played for West Coast Fever in the 2018 Suncorp Super Netball grand final.

England
Francis made her senior debut for England in September 2010 during an away series against Jamaica. She had previously represented England at under-17, under-19 and under-21 levels. She was subsequently a member of the England teams that won bronze medals at the 2010 Commonwealth Games and at the 2011 and 2015 Netball World Cups. She was also a member of the England team that won the 2011 World Netball Series. Francis made her 50th senior England appearance at the 2015 European Netball Championship in a match against Wales.

Personal life
Francis is in a relationship with her former Team Bath and England teammate, Sara Bayman. The couple got engaged in 2018 and married on 29 December 2020.

Honours
England
Fast5 Netball World Series
Winners: 2011: 1
Runners up : 2010, 2012: 2
Team Bath
Netball Superleague
Winners: 2005–06, 2006–07, 2008–09, 2009–10, 2013: 5
West Coast Fever
Suncorp Super Netball
Runners up : 2018: 1
Individual
Netball Superleague Player of the Season
 2011, 2013: 2

References

1988 births
Living people
English netball players
Commonwealth Games bronze medallists for England
Commonwealth Games medallists in netball
Netball players at the 2010 Commonwealth Games
Netball players at the 2014 Commonwealth Games
AENA Super Cup players
Netball Superleague players
ANZ Championship players
Suncorp Super Netball players
Team Bath netball players
Yorkshire Jets players
Surrey Storm players
Mainland Tactix players
West Coast Fever players
English expatriate netball people in Australia
English expatriate netball people in New Zealand
LGBT netball players
English LGBT sportspeople
Black British sportswomen
Sportspeople from Birmingham, West Midlands
Sportspeople from Bromsgrove
Alumni of the University of Bath
Alumni of Cardiff Metropolitan University
English sportspeople of Saint Kitts and Nevis descent
2011 World Netball Championships players
2015 Netball World Cup players
Netball players at the 2022 Commonwealth Games
Medallists at the 2010 Commonwealth Games